Urech is a surname. Notable people with the surname include:

Christine Urech (born 1984), Swiss curler
Friedrich Urech (1844–1904), German chemist
Lisa Urech (born 1989), Swiss hurdler

See also
Urech hydantoin synthesis, it was named after Friedrich Urech, who published the reaction in 1873